Lieutenant-General Sir Jeremy Calcott Reilly KCB DSO (7 April 1934 – 1 January 2017) was a British Army officer who commanded 4th Armoured Division.

Military career 
Educated at Uppingham School and the Royal Military Academy Sandhurst, Reilly was commissioned into the Royal Warwickshire Regiment in 1954. He was given command of the 2nd Battalion Royal Regiment of Fusiliers in 1971. He was appointed an instructor at the Staff College, Camberley in 1974, Commander of 6th Field Force and the UK Mobile Force in 1979 and General Officer Commanding 4th Armoured Division in 1981. He went on to lead the Directorate of Business Delivery at the Ministry of Defence in 1983, to become Assistant Chief of Defence Staff at the Ministry of Defence in 1985 and to be Commander for Training and Arms Directors in 1986 before he retired in 1989.

Personal life 
In 1960 he married Julia Elizabeth Forrester; they had three daughters. He died on 1 January 2017 at the age of 82.

References 

1934 births
2017 deaths
Academics of the Staff College, Camberley
British Army generals
Knights Commander of the Order of the Bath
Companions of the Distinguished Service Order
People educated at Uppingham School
Royal Warwickshire Fusiliers officers
Graduates of the Royal Military Academy Sandhurst